The New Zealand men's national under 20 ice hockey team is the national under-20 ice hockey team of New Zealand. The team is controlled by the New Zealand Ice Hockey Federation, a member of the International Ice Hockey Federation.

History
New Zealand played its first game in 2004 against Turkey during the Division III tournament of the 2004 IIHF World U20 Championship. New Zealand won the game 3–2. The following year New Zealand gained promotion to Division II after finishing second in the Division III tournament of the 2005 IIHF World U20 Championship. During the 2006 Division II Group A tournament New Zealand suffered their worst defeat in international competition, losing to the Netherlands men's national junior ice hockey team 0–19. The team continued to compete at the World Championships up until 2008 where they gained promotion after winning the Division III tournament. During the tournament they also achieved their largest ever victory in international competition when they defeated Turkey 20–1. In 2009 New Zealand did not send a team to compete in the 2009 IIHF World U20 Championship but returned the following year to compete in the 2010 Division III tournament. In 2012 they finished third in the Division III tournament held in Dunedin, New Zealand.

Chris Eaden currently holds the team record for most points with 28 all of which he scored during the 2008 IIHF World U20 Championship, his only appearance for the New Zealand under-20 team.

International competitions
2004 World Junior Ice Hockey Championships. Finish: 6th in Division III (40th overall)
2005 World Junior Ice Hockey Championships. Finish: 2nd in Division III (36th overall)
2006 World Junior Ice Hockey Championships. Finish: 6th in Division II Group A (34th overall)
2007 World Junior Ice Hockey Championships. Finish: 3rd in Division III (37th overall)
2008 World Junior Ice Hockey Championships. Finish: 1st in Division III (35th overall)
2010 World Junior Ice Hockey Championships. Finish: 4th in Division III (38th overall)
2011 World Junior Ice Hockey Championships. Finish: 5th in Division III (39th overall)
2012 World Junior Ice Hockey Championships. Finish: 3rd in Division III (37th overall)
2013 World Junior Ice Hockey Championships. Finish: 3rd in Division III (37th overall)
2014 World Junior Ice Hockey Championships. Finish: 2nd in Division III (36th overall)
2015 World Junior Ice Hockey Championships. Finish: 2nd in Division III (36th overall)
2016 World Junior Ice Hockey Championships. Finish: 3rd in Division III (37th overall)
2017 World Junior Ice Hockey Championships. Finish: 4th in Division III (38th overall)
2018 World Junior Ice Hockey Championships. Finish: 6th in Division III (40th overall)
2019 World Junior Ice Hockey Championships. Finish: 8th in Division III (42nd overall)
2020 World Junior Ice Hockey Championships. Finish: 6th in Division III (40th overall)
2021 World Junior Ice Hockey Championships. Did not participate
2022 World Junior Ice Hockey Championships. Did not participate
2023 World Junior Ice Hockey Championships. Finish: 5th in Division III (39th overall)

References

External links
 New Zealand Ice Hockey Federation

Junior
Junior national ice hockey teams